The Star Trek canon is the set of all canonical material in the Star Trek universe. The official Star Trek website uses the term canon to refer to the various elements present in the television series and feature films of the franchise.

Television series
As a rule, all Star Trek television series that aired are considered part of the canon.

This policy does not make clear which version of the series is the canonical one. For example, the remastered episodes of the original series, released in 2006, present several visual differences from the episodes originally aired.

Roddenberry's impact
Gene Roddenberry was something of a revisionist when it came to canonicity. People who worked with Roddenberry remember that he used to handle canonicity, not on a series-by-series basis nor an episode-by-episode basis, but point by point. If he changed his mind on something, or if a fact in one episode contradicted what he considered to be a more important fact in another episode, he had no problem declaring that specific point not canonical.

Additionally, David Gerrold, in an interview about Star Trek: The Animated Series, commented on Roddenberry's parsimony and how it originally affected the Star Treks canon:

From non-canon to canon
Occasionally, writers will draw from non-canonical works in creating new canon. Such is the case of the first names for Hikaru Sulu and Nyota Uhura, which were first used in the novel The Entropy Effect and the reference book Star Trek II Biographies, respectively. Several concepts that first appeared in The Animated Series, which was considered to be non-canonical for several decades (1980s–2000s), were used in other Star Trek productions during that time. Kirk's middle name, first used in the episode "Bem" before it was used in Star Trek VI: The Undiscovered Country. (Gene Roddenberry wrote the novelisation of Star Trek: The Motion Picture and confirmed the middle name, Tiberius, in the Foreword.) The animated episode "Yesteryear" first introduced The Forge and the city of ShiKahr, which were later included in the Enterprise three-part story that started with "The Forge".

Unreadable text

One final issue comes from text that appears on props such as computer displays, but is not legible during the episode, except in modern HDTV broadcasts. The transcript of the text can often be obtained through behind-the-scenes pictures and interviews. This leads to the question of whether material that is in the episodes but cannot be seen clearly should be considered canon. Often, this material is inside jokes inserted by the production staff. Other kinds of information, such as the biographical information seen on a computer display in the Enterprise episode "In a Mirror, Darkly", has been stated to not be "hard canon".

Films
All official Star Trek feature films are also considered canonical. While not explicitly stated, the most complete released version of the films, including scenes missing from the theatrical version of a film but included in home releases or director's cuts, appear to be canonical. One scene, deleted from Star Trek II: The Wrath of Khan, revealed Peter Preston as the nephew of Scotty. Peter Preston is included in the canon database at StarTrek.com.

Adding confusion to the issue is the fact that Roddenberry is quoted as saying that he disliked the films, and "didn't much consider them canon". There exists no definitive list of which films in particular Roddenberry disliked, or what elements in them he did not consider canonical. For example, the reference book Star Trek Chronology states that Roddenberry considered elements of Star Trek V and Star Trek VI to be apocryphal, but it does not specify which particular elements in the films Roddenberry objected to.

The canonicity of extra features found on home DVD releases, such as deleted scenes, has never been explicitly addressed.

"Reboot" films (Kelvin Timeline)
Star Trek (the 2009 film), Into Darkness and Beyond occur in a separate timeline from the rest of the series. In June 2016, for the computer game Star Trek Online, CBS named this the Kelvin Timeline, after the USS Kelvin, which was attacked and destroyed in the opening scene of Star Trek. Former names for this universe have included the alternate timeline and the reboot series.

Events depicted in the Kelvin Timeline films that occur prior to the temporal incursion that creates the new time line, such as the destruction of the planet Romulus, have been referenced in later "prime timeline" works such as Star Trek: Picard and Star Trek: Discovery.

Publications

Original tie-in novels
Many of the original novels published by Pocket Books are not considered part of the canon. This was a guideline set early on by Gene Roddenberry, and repeated many times by people who worked with him.

And as long as Gene Roddenberry is involved in it, he is the final word on what is Star Trek. So, for us here – Ron Moore, Jeri Taylor, everybody who works on the show – Gene is the authority. And when he says that the books, and the games, and the comics and everything else, are not gospel, but are only additional Star Trek based on his Star Trek but not part of the actual Star Trek universe that he created... they're just, you know, kinda fun to keep you occupied between episodes and between movies, whatever... but he does not want that to be considered to be sources of information for writers, working on this show, he doesn't want it to be considered part of the canon by anybody working on any other projects.— Richard Arnold, 1991

However, even this rule is not without rare exceptions. Two Voyager novels written by Jeri Taylor (co-creator and then producer of Voyager), Mosaic and Pathways, were written early on in Voyagers run and detailed the background of the series' main characters. These were meant to be canon, and to be used as references by the series' writers when fleshing out the characters. These two novels are sometimes named as exceptions to the "no book is canon" rule. However, as some of the background information mentioned in those books was never referenced in an episode of Voyager, or was contradicted in episodes written after they were published, their status as canon is still open to debate.

Novelizations
The novelizations of episodes and movies are not considered canon. This is a tradition that also goes back to Roddenberry himself. His novelization of Star Trek: The Motion Picture includes many tangents and new information. It reveals, for instance, that the woman who dies in the transporter accident was Kirk's former spouse. While this novel filled in many gaps left in the movie, Roddenberry is quoted as saying it should not be considered canon.

Reference books
There are conflicting messages concerning "non-fiction" reference books such as The Star Trek Encyclopedia, Star Trek Chronology, Star Trek: The Next Generation Technical Manual and Star Trek: Deep Space Nine Technical Manual. Unlike the novels and novelizations, these reference manuals have never been explicitly named as non-canon, and the fact that they were officially sanctioned by Paramount and given to episode writers as guides serves to give them an aura of credibility. Roddenberry himself considered it part of the "background" of Star Trek. Meanwhile, Michael Okuda and Rick Sternbach, artists and technical consultants since Star Trek: The Next Generation and the authors of several of these reference books, considered their work "pretty official". However, they stop short of naming the books canon, leaving the debate open.

Star Trek writer and co-producer Ronald D. Moore dismisses such official material as "speculation", and says that the writing staff did not consider it canon. However, in a series of posts to the official Star Trek website's forums, Viacom Senior Director Harry Lang left no doubt that he considers the reference books as canon.

Other publications
Star Trek comic books and magazines are generally not considered part of the canon. Regarding IDW Publishing's comic book tie-ins to the 2009 film and its sequel, screenwriter Roberto Orci felt that the background information conveyed in those books could be considered canonically accurate. Using rules similar to the ones that governed Star Wars canon at the time, he acknowledged that the extended universe material he oversees could remain part of the accepted canon unless contradicted by future films or television series.

Other material
Nothing that takes place in Star Trek games, the Star Trek: The Experience attraction, Star Trek fan productions or Trekdom is considered part of the canon.

Roddenberry-approved material
Based on the amount of creative control Roddenberry exerted over the first seasons of Star Trek, some people argue that only Roddenberry-approved material should be considered canonical. Such an approach would eliminate from the canon anything Roddenberry disliked, as well as everything made after his death, including seven movies and multiple television series.

However, Roddenberry himself preemptively rebuked such an attitude. He had hoped that Star Trek would go on after his death. As Star Trek was constantly improved by each following generation, he expected people to look back upon its humble beginnings as just that, the simple beginnings of something much bigger and better.

Klingon language 
The Klingon language was first conceived by James Doohan for the movie Star Trek: The Motion Picture, and consisted only of a few words. Later, Marc Okrand proceeded to flesh out the sparse vocabulary into a real language, complete with grammar rules and phonology, and went so far as to publish The Klingon Dictionary (1985, revised edition 1992); the Klingon Language Institute was created soon thereafter. Okrand's Klingon language was used to write the Klingon dialogues heard in several Star Trek movies and episodes. Okrand has developed the language in an important way in two audio-courses: Conversational Klingon (1992) and Power Klingon (1993), and in two books: The Klingon Way (1996) and Klingon for the Galactic Traveller (1997).  Despite these facts, however, Ronald D. Moore stated in 1997: "Whether or not [Trek writers] use the language as spelled out in Marc's dictionary is up to the individual writer," and that he "find[s] the dictionary cumbersome and usually find[s] it easier to make [the language] up phonetically."

See also
 Timeline of Star Trek
 Outline of Star Trek

References

External links
 What is considered Star Trek "canon"? archived version at archive.org, no longer live at StarTrek.com, the official Star Trek website.

Canon
Canons (fiction)